Taymyr Nature Reserve (also Taimyrsky) is a Russian 'zapovednik' (strict nature reserve) located in the northern lowlands of Siberia, on the Taimyr Peninsula, and on the coast of the Laptev Sea of the Arctic Ocean. The reserve includes the most northern forest of Dahurian larch in the world, and also the most northern mainland mountain range in the world. The protected area was established to protect the breeding grounds of the Red-breasted goose (Branta ruficollis) as well as the summer residences of wild reindeer (Rangifer tarandus) and the biodiversity of the Lake Taymyr. The reserve is situated about 120 km east of the town of Norilsk, and 3,000 km northeast of Moscow, in the Taymyrsky Dolgano-Nenetsky District of Krasnoyarsk Krai. In 1995, the site was designated a UNESCO MAB (Man and Biosphere) Reserve.

Topography
The Taymyr Reserve protects territory in the North Siberian Lowlands and the Byrranga Mountains.  The terrain is river valley tundra and bogs, and coastal arctic desert.  Aside from Byrranga mountains dominant features are Lake Taymyr and the Khatanga River.  There are four separate sectors of the reserve:

 Lisoviy Ary-Mas.  The most northern forest of Dahurian larch, about 20 km by 0.5–4 km, on sandy terraces above the New River.   Glacial moraines can reach 100 meters in height.
 Mount Byrranga.  The most northern mainland mountain range in the world, rising from 200 meters in the southeast to 1,000 meters in the northeast.  Mount Byrranga supports 96 glaciers (2016).
 Lake Levinson-Lessing.  Tectonic fault lake in the northeast of the reserve, with depths up to 130 meters.
 Arctic land.  A polar desert zone on the Laptev Sea Coast in the vicinity of Pronchishchev Bay.  This sector supports a walrus rookery (1,200 individuals, 2016), polar bear breeding sites (40-50 individuals, 2016), and marine mammals and nesting sites for coastal birds.

Climate and ecoregion
Taymyr is located in the Taimyr-Central Siberian tundra ecoregion.  This ecoregion covers the shore of the White Sea and the Arctic Ocean, including the inlets and islands.  The low wetlands are important breeding grounds for waterfowl.

The climate of Taymyr is Subarctic climate, without dry season (Köppen climate classification Subarctic climate (Dfc)). This climate is characterized by mild summers (only 1–3 months above ) and cold, snowy winters (coldest month below ). Average precipitation is 200–300 mm/year.

Flora and fauna 
The entire reserve is in the zone of continual permafrost, with extensive thermokarst landscapes.  The plant life of the reserve is mostly forbes and lichen.  In the river valleys and along the lake shores there are thickets of willow and dwarf birch.  Although research is ongoing, scientists in a modern inventory have recorded 475 species of vascular plants, 302 species of mosses, and 269 species of lichens.

The animal life of the reserve is sparse: of the 25 species of mammals encountered, half are seasonal or migratory visitors.  The most common are Siberian and Collard lemmings.   They are the primary food of the predators, mainly fox.  Hoofed animals are represented by Musk ox and reindeer.  As of 2014, the herd of reindeer in the Taimayr region was estimated at 550,000 - 600,000 individuals.  The musk ox, introduced in the 1970s, have prospered, numbering over 9,000 by 2014.  The most common marine mammal is the ringed seal.   The coastal sector has a large walrus rookery, and significant polar bear breeding sites.   The reserve attracts large number of waterfowl, from 21 species, most of which nest on the site.  Geese populations in the tens of thousands collect on Lake Taymyr, and the reserve supports the vulnerable Red-breasted goose.  A common site is the Wheatear.  Most of the migratory birds are only on the reserve site for four months, from May to September.

Ecoeducation and access
As a strict nature reserve, the Taymyr Reserve is mostly closed to the general public, although scientists and those with 'environmental education' purposes can make arrangements with park management for visits.   There are a number of 'ecotourist' routes in the reserve, however, that are open to the public, the main ones being in the Byrranga mountains and on the northern coast.   Permits must be obtained in advance, and foreign tourists must go through additional security procedures at the main office in the city of Norilsk.

See also 
 List of Russian Nature Reserves (class 1a 'zapovedniks')
 National Parks of Russia

References

External links
 Official Map of Taimyrsky Reserve
  Map of Taymyr Reserve, OpenStreetMap
  Map of Taymyr Reserve, ProtectedPlanet

Nature reserves in Russia
Protected areas established in 1979
1979 establishments in Russia
Geography of Krasnoyarsk Krai
Zapovednik